Philipp Brammer (28 August 1969 – 28 July 2014) was a German actor from Munich.

He began his voice acting career with the German dub of Nils no Fushigi na Tabi, and has since gone on to other things, such as being the dubover artist of Jason Priestley and Aamir Khan. He was best known as the teacher Jan Günzel in the ARD series Lindenstraße.

On Monday 28 July 2014, he did not return from a mountain tour to the Edelweißlahnerkopf. After his wife made a missing report to the local police, a search and rescue mission were started by the mountain rescue service and the police.

His body was found on Friday 1 August 2014. He died as a result of a fall by accident.
He left behind his wife and their two daughters.

Roles
Austin Powers: International Man of Mystery (Austin Powers (Mike Myers))
Battlestar Galactica (Lieutenant Gaeta (Alessandro Juliani))
Beverly Hills, 90210 (Brandon Walsh (Jason Priestley))
Doctor Who (Tenth Doctor (David Tennant))
Final Fantasy VII Advent Children (Reno (Keiji Fujiwara))
Hitch (Neil (Kevin Sussman))
Idiocracy (Joe Bauers (Luke Wilson))
The Hitchhiker's Guide to the Galaxy (Arthur Dent (Martin Freeman))
The Island of Thirty Coffins (François, Éric (Pascal Sellier))
Kingdom Hearts II (Axel (Keiji Fujiwara))
Marvin's Room (Hank (Leonardo DiCaprio))
One Piece (Roronoa Zoro (Kazuya Nakai))
Ratatouille (Remy (Patton Oswalt))
Scream (Stuart Macher (Matthew Lillard))
Smallville (DVD edition) (Lex Luthor (Michael Rosenbaum))
Stargate Atlantis (Aiden Ford (Rainbow Sun Francks))
Trainspotting (Daniel "Spud" Murphy (Ewen Bremner))
Tru Calling (Jack Harper (Jason Priestley))

References

External links

Agency Notabene 
Philipp Brammer at the German Dubbing Card Index

German male film actors
German male television actors
German male voice actors
Male actors from Munich
1969 births
2014 deaths